Trent Cull (born September 27, 1973) is a Canadian former professional ice hockey defenceman who most recently served as an assistant coach with the Vancouver Canucks of the National Hockey League (NHL).

Cull played ten seasons of professional hockey, including 435 regular-season games in the American Hockey League (AHL), where he scored 20 goals and 50 assists for 70 points, while earning 1049 career penalty minutes.

Following his playing career, Cull took up coaching to work as an AHL assistant coach with the Syracuse Crunch under Ross Yates from 2006 to 2010. He then accepted a head coaching position in the Ontario Hockey League with the Sudbury Wolves, where he remained for three seasons before returning to the Syracuse Crunch as an assistant coach with the 2013–14 season. In 2017, he was named head coach of the Utica Comets by their NHL affiliate, the Vancouver Canucks. He remained with the AHL team when it relocated as the Abbotsford Canucks in 2021.

Career statistics

Coaching record

AHL

References

External links

1973 births
Living people
Abbotsford Canucks coaches
Brantford Smoke players
Canadian ice hockey coaches
Canadian ice hockey defencemen
Houston Aeros (1994–2013) players
Kingston Frontenacs players
Owen Sound Platers players
Springfield Falcons players
St. John's Maple Leafs players
Syracuse Crunch players
Wilkes-Barre/Scranton Penguins players
Windsor Spitfires players